The 2018 Junior Pan Pacific Swimming Championships were held from 23 to 26 August 2018 at Damodar Aquatic Centre in Suva, Fiji, and were co-hosted by Fiji Swimming and USA Swimming. Competition was conducted in a long course (50 metre) pool. Finals were classified as A-final and B-final with medalists determined from the A-final.

Open water swimming was not contested due to the FINA World Junior Open Water Championships and a 4×100 metre mixed medley relay was introduced to the program.

Results

Men

Women

Mixed

Medal table

Championships records set
The following Championships records were set during the course of competition.

References

External links
 Results
 Results via Fiji Swimming
 Results book via USA Swimming

Swimming competitions in Fiji
2018 in swimming
August 2018 sports events in Oceania
2018 in Fijian sport